Pediasia ribbeellus is a species of moth in the family Crambidae described by Aristide Caradja in 1910. It is found in Spain and Portugal.

References

Moths described in 1910
Crambini
Moths of Europe